Taverna is a comune and town in the province of Catanzaro in the Calabria region of Italy. It is located at the feet of the Sila mountain range.

People
 Mattia Preti, 17th-century Baroque painter 
 Gregorio Preti, 17th-century Baroque painter, brother of Mattia Preti

References 

Cities and towns in Calabria